Haley Hayden (born June 19, 1995) is an American former collegiate softball player. She played college softball for Louisiana.

Career
She attended West Monroe High School and she later attended the University of Louisiana at Lafayette playing as a first baseman and outfielder, while playing for the Louisiana Ragin' Cajuns softball team. She is the Sun Belt Conference career leader in runs and led the Ragin' Cajuns to four consecutive NCAA Division I softball tournament appearances from 2014 to 2017, including an appearance in the Women's College World Series in 2014, where they lost to Oklahoma, 3–1.

Statistics

References

External links
 
 
Louisiana bio

1995 births
Softball players from Louisiana
Louisiana Ragin' Cajuns softball players
Living people
People from West Monroe, Louisiana